Anton "Ton" Gerrit Jan Buunk (born 18 September 1952) is a retired Dutch water polo player. He competed in the 1972, 1976, 1980 and 1984 Olympics and won a bronze medal in 1976, placing sixth-seventh on other occasions. He was given the honour to carry the national flag of the Netherlands at the opening ceremony of the 1984 Summer Olympics in Los Angeles, becoming the 15th water polo player to be a flag bearer at the opening and closing ceremonies of the Olympics. On 14 December 1979 he married Vera Renema.

See also
 Netherlands men's Olympic water polo team records and statistics
 List of Olympic medalists in water polo (men)
 List of players who have appeared in multiple men's Olympic water polo tournaments
 List of flag bearers for the Netherlands at the Olympics

References

External links
 

1952 births
Living people
Dutch male water polo players
Olympic bronze medalists for the Netherlands in water polo
Water polo players at the 1972 Summer Olympics
Water polo players at the 1976 Summer Olympics
Water polo players at the 1980 Summer Olympics
Water polo players at the 1984 Summer Olympics
Water polo players from Amsterdam
Medalists at the 1976 Summer Olympics
20th-century Dutch people